Alexey Vasilievich Tyranov (Russian: Алексей Васильевич Тыранов; 1808 in Bezhetsk – 3 August 1859 in Kashin) was a Russian portrait and genre painter.

Biography 
He was the son of a poor tradesman. After completing primary school in Bezhetsk, he attended the gymnasium in Tver, but was unable to complete his studies due to a lack of money. He returned home and began working for his brother Mikhail, who was an icon painter.

In 1824, while with his brother at the Monastery of St. Nicholas in Terebeni in Tver, he met the painter Alexey Venetsianov, who invited him to study at his art school in the nearby village of Safonkovo. After completing his studies there, he received Venetsianov's recommendation to audit classes at the Imperial Academy of Fine Arts and was granted permission to work at the Hermitage.

During this time, he made lithographs of Venetsianov's works on behalf of the Imperial Society for the Encouragement of the Arts. In 1830, the Academy awarded him a gold medal and named him an "Artist" in 1832. In 1836, he became a member of the Academy and began working with Karl Briullov. Three years later, he was named an "Academician" and was awarded a stipend to study in Rome.

After falling in love with one of his Italian models, he took her with him to Saint Petersburg in 1842. Two years later, she ran away with all of his money, which caused an emotional breakdown that left him mentally disturbed and subject to hypochondria. For long periods, he was unable to work and fell into poverty. Although he was eventually awarded a small pension by the Academy, he found it necessary to go live with his brother in Kashin and died there shortly after, apparently from tuberculosis.

Selected paintings

See also 
List of Russian artists

References

External links 

1808 births
1859 deaths
People from Bezhetsk
People from Bezhetsky Uyezd
19th-century painters from the Russian Empire
Russian male painters
Russian portrait painters
Russian genre painters
19th-century male artists from the Russian Empire
19th-century deaths from tuberculosis
Tuberculosis deaths in Russia